The 1946 Oregon State Beavers football team represented Oregon State College in the Pacific Coast Conference (PCC) during the 1946 college football season.  Led by twelfth-year head coach Lon Stiner, the Beavers compiled a 7–1–1 record (6–1–1 in PCC, second), and outscored their opponents 157 to 81. OSC played four home games on campus at Bell Field in Corvallis with two at Multnomah Stadium in Portland.

Schedule

After the season

The 1947 NFL Draft was held on December 16, 1946. The following Beavers were selected.

References

External links
 Game program: Oregon State at Washington State – October 26, 1946

Oregon State
Oregon State Beavers football seasons
Oregon State Beavers football